John Crombez (born 19 September 1973) is a Belgian politician. He has been leader of the Socialist Party Differently (sp.a) since 2015. In the Di Rupo Government (2011–2014) he was Secretary of State for combatting fraud.

In 2009, Crombez was elected to the Flemish Parliament, where he was parliamentary leader from July 2010 to December 2011 and has been again since September 2014.

Crombez studied economics at Ghent University.

External links
 
 John Crombez, Flemish Parliament

1973 births
Living people
Ghent University alumni
Members of the Flemish Parliament
Politicians from Ostend
Socialistische Partij Anders politicians
21st-century Belgian politicians